Berkshire East Ski Resort is a medium-sized alpine ski area in the northeastern United States, located in the Berkshires on Mount Institute in Charlemont and Hawley, Massachusetts.

History

Thunder Mountain Ski Area
Organized skiing started on Mt. Institute in the mid-1950s when Arthur Parker opened a small rope tow operation.  Due to weather and other difficulties, it closed after one short season.

Parker spent the balance of the decade gathering investors for a much larger operation on the same mountain.  The first double chairlift, a Mueller, was installed for the grand re-opening 1961-62 season.  A second double chairlift, another Mueller, was installed in 1962.

Notable skiers during this time included former Massachusetts Governor Endicott Peabody and U.S. Senator Ted Kennedy.

New ownership took over in late 1965, changing the name to Berkshire East at the end of the decade.

Berkshire East Ski Resort

The ownership group struggled, trying a variety of ill-fated expansion plans.  By 1975, Berkshire East was bankrupt and outdated with two partially installed chairlifts and two antiquated Mueller chairlifts.  Current management soon took over and began a steady series of investments.

A Hall double chairlift was installed in 1978.  A fourth chairlift, an SLI, was also installed in the late 1970s.

In 1995, the first Mueller double chairlift was replaced with a Poma triple chairlift.  A Hall double chairlift was added in 2001.  In 2003, the second Mueller double chairlift was replaced with a Borvig-Leitner quad chairlift.

In 2008, Berkshire East replaced a novice handle tow with a magic carpet lift.

As of 2008, the ski area has 45 trails and five lifts, in addition to the tubing slope and lift.  Berkshire East is currently the only alpine ski area in Franklin County open to the public.

In 2010, the Diamond Express Hall double chairlift (1978) was replaced with a Poma triple chairlift.

In 2011, the ski area added a PowerWind 56 900 kW wind turbine. This addition, makes Berkshire East the first ski area in the world to be 100% powered by onsite renewable energy.

In 2014, the Summit Triple lift (1995) was replaced by a brand new SkyTrac quad chairlift with a moving carpet loading area. The new lift will run at a faster speed than typical fixed grip lifts with a moving carpet that moves skiers into the loading area and assists with loading onto the faster moving chairs. The old Poma Summit Triple lift was moved to  Catamount Mountain Resort in Egremont, Massachusetts.

Terrain and Lifts
It has mixed terrain from beginner to expert level ability: 30% beginner runs, 35% intermediate, 30% advanced, and 5% expert runs. Berkshire also has 4 chairlifts.

Berkshire East also has a single Magic Carpet, located on the Bobcat novice slope.

Snowmaking

Berkshire East can make snow on all of its trails.  The snowmaking system is composed almost exclusively of fan guns.  The snowmaking fleet is dominated by SMI Polecats and Wizzards, as well as Areco fan guns.

Racing

Berkshire East and Thunder Mountain have both been known for strong racing programs.  Numerous successful racers, ranging from Massachusetts high school state champions to United States Ski Team members have trained and raced at Berkshire East.  Berkshire East frequently hosts USSA and MIAA slalom and giant slalom championship races. Additionally, it is a frequent venue for ski mountaineering races.

Other activities

In 2007, Berkshire East expanded operations beyond skiing and snowboarding by opening a snow tubing slope, serviced by a magic carpet surface lift.

In 2009, Berkshire East announced the construction of multiple zip lines, creating a canopy tour business called Berkshire East Canopy Tours.

Berkshire East Canopy Tours is one of the largest zip lines companies in North America.

In 2013, Berkshire East was given approval to build the longest Alpine Coaster in North America, and featured a mile (1.6 km) of steel track.

In the summer of 2014, the new mountain coaster was constructed, and that fall, construction began on a new downhill mountain bike park.

References

External links
  – Berkshire East Ski Area
 Berkshire East Canopy Tours - Official site
 SkiBerkshireEast.com - History and photos

Buildings and structures in Franklin County, Massachusetts
Ski areas and resorts in Massachusetts
Tourist attractions in Franklin County, Massachusetts
Sports in Franklin County, Massachusetts